The 4th Macau International Movie Festival ceremony, presented by the Macau Film and Television Media Association and China International Cultural Communication Center, honored the best films of 2012 and took place on December 13, 2012, at Macau UA Galaxy Cinemas in Macau.

Winners and nominees

References

External links

Golden Lotus Awards
Macau
2012 in Macau
Gold